Lorenzo Luzuriaga (1889–1959) was a Spanish educationalist. While in exile in Argentina following the Spanish Civil War, Luzuriaga translated several works by John Dewey, and popularized the figure among progressives.

Notes

References 

 
 
 
 
 

Spanish educators
Spanish translators
1889 births
1959 deaths
People from Ciudad Real
20th-century translators